LSF may refer to:

Science and technology
 IBM Spectrum LSF, a software job scheduler formerly called Platform LSF
 Laser-stimulated fluorescence, a spectroscopic method
 Late SV40 factor, a protein
 Lightweight steel framing, a building material
 Line spectral frequencies, in signal processing
 Line spread function, in optics

Organisations
 Financial Security Law of France
 Ledøje-Smørum Fodbold, an association football club in Denmark

Other uses
 French Sign Language
 Latino sine flexione, a constructed language
 "L.S.F." (song) or "L.S.F. (Lost Souls Forever)", by Kasabian
 Law Society's Final Examination, replaced by the Legal Practice Course, UK
 Liberty Security Force, a faction in the video game Freelancer